iSmart Shankar  is a 2019 Indian Telugu-language science fiction masala film written and directed by Puri Jagannadh, who co-produced the film with Charmme Kaur. It stars Ram Pothineni in the titular role along with Satyadev, Nabha Natesh, and Nidhhi Agerwal. The film follows an assassin who helps the cops when a slain cop's memories are transferred to his brain. It features music composed by Mani Sharma.

The film is released theatrically on 18 July 2019. It is a commercial success, running for more than 100 days at the box office. A sequel titled Double iSmart has been announced. The film received mixed reviews from critics with praise for the cast's performance, score and action sequences but criticism for the second half and climax.

Plot
Ismart Shankar is a street-smart assassin who works under another assassin named Kaka. One day, Shankar encounters a rough woman named Chandini, when he was extorting money from an apartment complex builder. Impressed, Shankar falls for Chandini and tries various ways to impress her. Despite being annoyed at first, Chandini realizes her mistake. Under Kaka's orders, Shankar kills CM Kasi Vishwanath and escapes to Goa with Chandini. However, the cops learn about their location and a shootout ensues where Chandini gets killed and Shankar getting arrested. Meanwhile, Sara, a neuroscientist who is working on memory transfer has achieved successful results with rats. Sara's boyfriend/fianceè Arun is a CBI officer, who is investigating Kasi Vishwanath's murder, believes that a higher force had planned and killed him. Shankar gets released from prison and deduces that Kaka had a major role in Chandni's death and has been ordered to kill him as well. 

Kaka tries to escape, but Shankar shoots Kaka in Sarah's car and flees while Sara calls Arun. Arun catches a guy, but the guy is killed in a car accident and Arun's higher officials are after him to find the killer. When Arun is about to crack the case, he is shot and killed by the goons. CBI officer Chandrakanth is desperate to know about the killer, where they transfer Arun's memory to Shankar with Sara's help, knowing that Arun's memory will remove his past. Shankar wakes up and experiences memories that aren't his own. He gets enraged when Sara reveals the truth to him and realizes that he will forget Chandni in a few days. Shankar experiences brief flashes where he becomes Arun, but reverts to being Shankar. Shankar finds Arun's house and discovers a bag that has evidences about the murderer, where he calls the Chandrakanth to meet him in Goa. When Arun is about to reveal the identity of the murderers, he reverts back to Shankar and beats all the cops and takes Sara at knifepoint, where he escapes. 

After a few events, Shankar reverts back to Arun and reveals to Chandrakanth that Kasi Vishwanath's son Devendra and brother-in-law Central Minister Ramamurthy are the murderers. With the help of Chandrakanth, Shankar devises a plan to arrest Devendra and Ramamurthy with  the evidence in Benaras. Devendra gets exposed and escapes, where Arun follows him, but Devendra and his men continuously beat Arun in his head, which results in Arun getting reverted back to Shankar. Sara tells Shankar that Devendra is responsible for Chandni's murder. After a tragic/dramatic fight between Shankar and Devendra, Shankar kills Devendra, thus avenging Chandini's death. Sara and Arun/Shankar leave for Hong Kong on vacation, where Arun/Shankar proposes to Sara, who happily agrees.

Cast 

 Ram Pothineni as Shankar/Arun
 Satyadev as Arun
 Nabha Natesh as Chandni
 Nidhhi Agerwal as Dr. Sarah
 Sayaji Shinde as Chandrakanth, CBI Officer
 Ashish Vidyarthi as Ramamoorthy, Central Minister
 Raj Deepak Shetty as Devendra Viswanath
 Tulasi as Viswanath's Wife
 Getup Srinu as Shankar's friend
Aziz Naser
 Puneet Issar as CM Kashi Viswanath
 Madhusudhan Rao as Kaka
 Gangavva as Woman in lorry
 Lekha Prajapati in "Bonalu" song
 Puri Jagannadh as himself in the song "iSmart Theme"

Production
Principal photography began in January 2019 in Hyderabad. The first schedule finished in February 2019. The second schedule took place in Goa and the filming resumed in March 2019. The cast have shot action scenes of the film in April 2019 and the third schedule took place in Varanasi. The filming was completed in mid May 2019.

Release
The film was released theatrically on 18 July 2019. The film was also dubbed and released in Hindi on YouTube on 16 February 2020 by Aditya Movies. The Hindi dubbed version crossed more than 300 million views.

Soundtrack

Reception 
Firstpost gave 3 out of 5 stars stating, "iSmart Shankar is proof enough that Puri Jagannadh is back with a bang. It might not be his best film, but it’s certainly his most watchable film in years. And Ram is a ball of energy. iSmart Shankar might have its roots in Eternal Sunshine of the Spotless Mind, but Puri Jagannadh gives it his own spin and reimagines it as a quintessential Telugu mass film.".

The Times of India gave 2.5 out of 5 stars stating, "In this make-believe world, when rules change by-the-minute, it’s hard to give a damn". Sify gave 2.5 out of 5 stars stating "iSmart Shankar is aimed at frontbenchers. Despite the idea of transplantation of memories being new, the rest of the story and its treatment are over-the-top and too clichéd. This is a loud mass action-thriller".

Awards and nominations

Sequel 

A sequel titled Double iSmart has been announced. In September 2022, it has been reported that the sequel is currently being developed due to Jagannadh's film, Jana Gana Mana, being shelved.

Notes

References

External links

2010s Telugu-language films
2019 science fiction action films
Indian science fiction action films
Films directed by Puri Jagannadh
2019 films
Fiction about memory
Films shot in Hyderabad, India
Films shot in Goa
Films shot in Uttar Pradesh
Films about contract killing in India
Indian films about revenge
Indian vigilante films
2010s vigilante films
Indian science fiction films